LC5  may refer to:

 Launch Complex 5 (disambiguation), two American launch pads
 Local Council 5, one of five Local Council levels in Uganda
 LC5, was a free replacement tool similar to L0phtcrack. No longer being developed.
 Could stand for 5 gallons of liquid chlorine (liquid chlorine 5gal)